Cross Creek Township is one of the fourteen townships of Jefferson County, Ohio, United States.  The 2010 census recorded 8,348 people in the township, 5,214 of whom lived in the unincorporated portions of the township.

Geography
Located in the central part of the county, it borders the following townships and city:
Island Creek Township - north
Salem Township - northwest corner
Steubenville - northeast
Steubenville Township - east
Wayne Township - west
Wells Township - south

Northeastern Cross Creek Township is occupied by parts of the city of Steubenville, the county seat of Jefferson County.  Villages in the township include part of New Alexandria in the south and part of Wintersville in the north.

Name and history
Cross Creek Township was founded in 1806.

It is the only Cross Creek Township statewide.

Government
The township is governed by a three-member board of trustees, who are elected in November of odd-numbered years to a four-year term beginning on the following January 1. Two are elected in the year after the presidential election and one is elected in the year before it. There is also an elected township fiscal officer, who serves a four-year term beginning on April 1 of the year after the election, which is held in November of the year before the presidential election. Vacancies in the fiscal officership or on the board of trustees are filled by the remaining trustees.

References

External links
County website

Townships in Jefferson County, Ohio
Townships in Ohio